Odontura is a genus of bush crickets in the subfamily Phaneropterinae and typical of the tribe Odonturini.  Species can be found in Africa and Europe (Iberian peninsula).

Species 
The Orthoptera Species File lists:
subgenus Odontura Rambur, 1838
 Odontura algerica Brunner von Wattenwyl, 1878
 Odontura borrei Bolívar, 1878
 Odontura brevis Werner, 1932
 Odontura calaritana Costa, 1883
 Odontura glabricauda (Charpentier, 1825)type species (as Barbitistes glabricauda Charpentier)
 Odontura liouvillei Werner, 1929
 Odontura maroccana Bolívar, 1908
 Odontura microptera Chopard, 1943
 Odontura moghrebica Morales-Agacino, 1950
 Odontura pulchra Bolívar, 1914
 Odontura quadridentata Krauss, 1893
 Odontura stenoxypha (Fieber, 1853)
 Odontura trilineata (Haan, 1843)
 Odontura uvarovi Werner, 1929
subgenus Odonturella Bolívar, 1900
 Odontura aspericauda Rambur, 1838
 Odontura macphersoni Morales-Agacino, 1943

References

External links 
 
 

Tettigoniidae genera
Phaneropterinae
Orthoptera of Europe
Orthoptera of Africa